Jeffrey D. Weidenhamer is a Trustees’ Distinguished Professor at Ashland University and Professor of Chemistry. He is also chair of the Department of Chemistry, Geology & Physics and a member of the Environmental Science Faculty.

Weidenhamer has a bachelor's degree from Ashland University, master's degrees from Ohio State University and Louisiana State University and a Ph.D. from the University of South Florida.

References

Living people
21st-century American chemists
Ashland University alumni
Ohio State University alumni
Louisiana State University alumni
University of South Florida alumni
Ashland University faculty
Year of birth missing (living people)